Robert "Bob" Chassell was one of the founding directors of the Free Software Foundation (FSF).

Life 

Bob was born on 22 August 1946, in Bennington, VT. He read economics at Peterhouse, Cambridge University.

In 1985, he became one of the founding directors of the FSF. While on the Board of Directors, he was also the treasurer for the FSF. At this time, he started the Texinfo documentation system for GNU together with Richard Stallman.

He left the FSF to become a full-time speaker on free software topics. He was diagnosed with progressive supranuclear palsy (PSP) in 2010, and died as a result on 30 June 2017.

Chassell has authored several books including:

References

External links

 A 30 minute audio interview with Robert
 An online copy of "Software Freedom: An Introduction"
 An online copy of "An Introduction to Programming in Emacs Lisp"
 Tribute to Robert J. Chassell on Bradley M. Kuhn's Personal Blog
 Tribute to Robert J. Chassell on the Software Freedom Conservancy Website
 Robert J. Chassell's writings are at Richard M. Stallman's personal website

GNU people
Free software people
Open content people
Alumni of Peterhouse, Cambridge
Neurological disease deaths in Massachusetts
Deaths from progressive supranuclear palsy
1946 births
2017 deaths